La Soufrière – Warten auf eine unausweichliche Katastrophe ("La Soufrière – Waiting for an Inevitable Disaster") is a 1977 documentary film in which German director Werner Herzog visits an island on which a volcano is predicted to erupt. The pretext of this film was provided when Herzog "heard about the impending volcanic eruption, that the island of Guadeloupe had been evacuated and that one peasant had refused to leave, [he] knew [he] wanted to go talk to him and find out what kind of relationship towards death he had" (Cronin). Herzog explores the deserted streets of the towns on the island. The crew of three treks up to the caldera, where clouds of sulfurous steam and smoke drift like "harbingers of death" (Peucker), an example of the sublime Herzog seeks to conjure in his films. Herzog converses in French with three different men he finds remaining on the island: one says he is waiting for death, and even demonstrates his posture for doing so; another says he has stayed to look after the animals. In the end, the volcano did not erupt, thus sparing the lives of those who had remained on the island, including Herzog and his crew.

References
 Paul Cronin, Herzog on Herzog (London: Faber and Faber Ltd., 2002) p. 148. 
 Brigitte Peucker, "In Quest of the Sublime," New German Filmmakers: From Oberhausen Through the 1970s, edited by Klaus Phillips (New York: Frederick Ungar Publishing Co., 1984, hardcover:  and paperback) p. 168.

External links

La Soufriere at Allmovie
Werner Herzog on filming La Soufrière (Video interview from Capturing Reality: The Art of Documentary)

1977 films
1977 documentary films
German documentary films
West German films
Documentary films about disasters
Films set in Guadeloupe
Films shot in Guadeloupe
Documentary films about volcanoes
1970s German films